Carleton Forehoe is a village and former civil parish  west of Norwich, now in the parish of Kimberley, in the South Norfolk district, in the county of Norfolk, England. In 1931 the parish had a population of 123.

History
Carleton Forehoe's name is of Anglo-Saxon and Viking origin and derives from an amalgamation of the Old English and Old Norse for a settlement of free men close to four earthen mounds.

In the Domesday Book, Carleton Forehoe was recorded Carletuna/Karletuna with 40 households and the principal village in the hundred of Forehoe. The land of the village was divided between King William, Alan of Brittany and St Benet's Abbey. 

On 1 April 1935 the parish was abolished and merged with Kimberley.

St. Mary's Church
Carleton Forehoe's Parish Church is of Norman origin and is dedicated to Saint Mary. It is unusual for Norfolk churches due to the red brick elements of the churchtower.

War Memorial
Carleton Forehoe's War Memorial takes the form of a plaque inside St. Mary's Church. It lists the following names for the First World War:
 Sergeant Bertie Bowles (1891-1917), Norfolk Yeomanry
 Corporal Donald J. Hadingham (1884-1917), 163rd Company, Machine Gun Corps
 Lance-Corporal Bertie G. Hadingham (1890-1915), 1/6th Battalion, Essex Regiment
 Private Edgar C. Hardiment (1886-1916), 8th Battalion, Border Regiment

References

External links 

Villages in Norfolk
Former civil parishes in Norfolk
Kimberley, Norfolk